The Institute of Christ the King Sovereign Priest (ICKSP;  [];  []) is a Roman Catholic society of apostolic life of pontifical right in communion with the Holy See of the Catholic Church. The institute has the stated goal of honoring God and the sanctification of priests in the service of the Catholic Church and souls. An integral part of the institute's charism is the use of the traditional Latin liturgy of 1962 for Mass and the other sacraments. It has undertaken the restoration of a number of historic church buildings.

The institute's rule of life is based generally on that of the secular canons. Its stated mission is the defense and propagation of the reign of Christ in all areas of human life, both private and social.

Early years
The institute was canonically erected on 1 September 1990 by Gilles Wach and Philippe Mora in Gabon, Africa, where the Institute still has missions, notably in the capital Libreville. Its canonical status was of diocesan right until 7 October 2008. On that date, it was granted the status of pontifical right by decree, titled Saeculorum Rex, of the Pontifical Commission Ecclesia Dei, on the occasion of the visit of Camille Perl, the vice-president of the commission. Deacons and priests are incardinated into the institute, whose prior general has the right to call to orders. 

The institute is based in Gricigliano, Italy, in the Archdiocese of Florence. Its international seminary of Saint Philip Neri is also located there, and the institute's ordinations and other major masses are held at the church of San Gaetano in Florence.

Wach serves as prior general and Mora as rector of the seminary. Both received their priestly formation under Cardinal Giuseppe Siri of Genoa. As of 2021, the institute has 121 priests, as well as clerical oblates who go through formation but may only be ordained up to the permanent diaconate, working instead for the several apostolates of the institute.

The charism of the institute is based on the example of its three patron saints:
Francis de Sales, who emphasized teaching the Catholic faith with patience and charity, encouraging all Catholics to a life of holiness through the ordinary means of the Church, such as devout attendance at Mass and frequent confession.
Benedict of Nursia, with his love for the solemn celebration of the liturgy, his emphasis on work and prayer, "Benedictine hospitality", and role in laying the groundwork for an integral Christian civilization in medieval Europe.
Thomas Aquinas, with his emphasis on the harmony between faith and reason.

The institute also honors as its primary patroness the Virgin Mary under the title "of the Immaculate Conception, to Whom it is consecrated." Saint Thérèse of the Child Jesus is the patroness of its African missions.

Apostolates
In the United States, the institute is headquartered in Chicago, with presences in Illinois, Wisconsin, Missouri, New Jersey, Connecticut, California, Arizona, Michigan, Pennsylvania, Louisiana, and Ohio. In Chicago, the institute is restoring the historic Saint Clara/Saint Gelasius Church on Carmelite Way, which is also the site of the headquarters for the American Province of the institute. Upon completion, it will become the Shrine of Christ the King.

Its oldest United States apostolate is the Saint Mary Oratory in Rockford, Illinois, and its newest is the Saint Leo Oratory in Columbus, Ohio. In Kansas City, Missouri, Bishop Robert Finn established an oratory (a public church where Mass and other rites may be administered) in 2005 for the institute at a historic church otherwise in danger of being closed. Also in 2005 St. Francis de Sales Church in Saint Louis, Missouri was established as an oratory under care of the institute, to serve the city and region. It is leading efforts to restore the church and has installed a new organ. The superior for the United States is Matthew Talarico.

In England, the institute is active in the Catholic dioceses of Liverpool, Lancaster, Shrewsbury and East Anglia. In 2011 the Bishop of Shrewsbury invited the institute to re-open the Church of Saints Peter, Paul, and Philomena in New Brighton.

Since Saint Patrick's Day, 17 March 2006, the institute has had a presence in the Diocese of Limerick in the Republic of Ireland. In Limerick, they purchased Sacred Heart Church, Since May 2010, the institute has expanded into the Irish diocese of Galway, where weekly Mass is offered at Saint Mary's College school; monthly Masses are offered by priests of the institute in Ennis. The institute is also closely involved in the annual Catholic Voice conference held in Limerick, which features amongst its regular speakers Cardinal Raymond Leo Burke and John Hunwicke. Since December 2019 the institute has had an established apostolate in Belfast (Diocese of Down and Connor) following the purchase of the former Fortwilliam & Macrory Church. In April 2021, the Institute purchased a convent in Ardee, County Louth for use by a community of its female religious, the Sisters Adorers.

In addition to its oratories in the United States and missions in Africa, the institute also has apostolates in France, Spain, Belgium, Italy, Germany, Austria, and Switzerland. It also has care of Santi Celso e Giuliano, a papal chapel and minor basilica in Rome, as of 2019. The institute is especially active in the domain of education, running schools in France (Montpellier, Lille and Versailles), Belgium (Brussels International Catholic School), and Africa.

During its yearly ordinations week in Italy, the institute has had visits by Cardinals Raymond Leo Burke, Antonio Cañizares Llovera, Darío Castrillón Hoyos, and Giuseppe Siri, as well as Archbishop Camille Perl.

Sisters Adorers of the Royal Heart of Jesus

The Adorers of the Royal Heart of Jesus Christ Sovereign Priest are a women's community founded in 2001 that is associated with the institute. They are also based in Gricigliano. The sisters are non-cloistered contemplatives, and their way of life is based on the Benedictine tradition.

The community celebrates Mass and the Divine Office using the traditional form of the Roman Rite, celebrated according to the pre–Vatican II rubrics. Needlework and embroidery projects form an important part of their daily Ora et Labora ("Pray and Work").

When the number of sisters has increased sufficiently, the community plans to plant convents near the institute's churches, where the sisters will perform apostolic work such as teaching. , the sisters numbered 42. The sisters have established a presence in Germany in addition to their Novitiate, which is in Naples.

Society of the Sacred Heart
The Society of the Sacred Heart is a lay society associated with the institute. The lay members of the society pledge to live according to a modified Benedictine rule, within their vocation. Through membership in the society, lay faithful can participate in the spiritual and social missions of the institute through prayer, devotions, spiritual direction, and study of the spiritual writings of Saint Francis de Sales.

Superiors
Gilles Wach is the founder and prior general.

Philippe Mora is the co-founder and rector of the international Saint Philip Neri Seminary in Gricigliano.

Rudolf Michael Schmitz is the vicar general of the institute and provincial of the German-speaking countries.

Choir dress
The institute has its own choir dress, adopted in 2006, which it received from Cardinal Ennio Antonelli, Archbishop of Florence. It consists of a rochet, mantelletta, mozzetta, pectoral cross, and biretta.
Priests, superiors, and the prior general

See also

Consecrated life
Institutes of consecrated life
Religious institute (Catholic)
Secular institute
Vocational Discernment in the Catholic Church

References

External links
 Institute of Christ the King Sovereign Priest
 Sisters Adorers of the Royal Heart of Jesus
 Society of the Sacred Heart

International links
Italian
French
German
Spanish
Irish

 
Christian organizations established in 1990
Societies of apostolic life
Traditionalist Catholicism
Communities using the Tridentine Mass